Mediacorp Pte. Ltd. is a state-owned media conglomerate in Singapore. Owned by Temasek Holdings—the holding company of  the Government of Singapore—it owns television, radio, and digital media properties in the country.

Mediacorp forms one half of the mass media duopoly in the country, alongside SPH Media Trust.

History

1925–1965: Pre-independence era

Radio broadcasting
The history of radio broadcasting in Singapore began with the formation of the Amateur Wireless Society of Malaya (AWSM) in April 1925, which launched shortwave transmission from a studio in the Union Building at Collyer Quay using a 100-watt transmitter lent by the Marconi Company under callsign 1SE (One Singapore Experimental). The transmissions could be received from as far as Penang, albeit with atmospheric interferences at times. In 1930, Sir Earl from the Singapore Port Authority commenced its short wave broadcast every fortnight either on Sundays or Wednesdays. The Empire Service of the British Broadcasting Corporation (BBC) was inaugurated in December 1932, which expanded the array of programmes available for resident listeners. In 1933, Radio ZHI was launched as the first professional shortwave broadcasting station in Singapore. Owned by the Radio Service Company of Malaya, it was a shortwave radio station that delivered static-free broadcasts. Throughout its history, Radio ZHI acquired a loyal following in Singapore and abroad. Despite its success, the station closed in 1936 when its licence expired. British Malaya Broadcasting Corporation was formed on 21 July 1935 and awarded a broadcasting license by the British crown on 1 June 1936 as a radio network. On 1 March 1937 at 6pm, its studios and transmitters at Caldecott Hill was officially opened by Governor of the Straits Settlements Shenton Thomas.

The corporation was taken over by the Straits Settlements government in 1940 as a part of the British Department of Information, subsequently nationalised and reorganised as the Malaya Broadcasting Corporation, the local counterpart to the British Broadcasting Corporation (BBC). During World War II, Japanese Imperial Army occupy Singapore from 1942 to 1945 and the radio station on the island of Singapore was seized by the Japanese authorities and renamed Syonan Hoso Kyoku ('Light of the South' Broadcasting Corporation), the local counterpart to the Japan Broadcasting Corporation (NHK). After the war, the British came back into power and reclaimed the radio station, with the station managed by the interim government – British Military Administration (BMA).

On 1 April 1946, Radio Malaya Singapore and the Federation of Malaya (RMSFOM; or Radio Malaya), a short- and mediumwave service, was established in Singapore. Radio news and information, as well as local entertainment, were aired on its stations in English and later Mandarin Chinese and Malay. On the basis of the Radio Malaya broadcasters that moved to Kuala Lumpur in 1958, Radio Singapura took over on 4 January 1959 as the radio service for Singapore, organised into a station each for English, Malay and Mandarin listeners, plus a blocktime slot for Tamil speakers. When Singapore joined Malaysia on 16 September 1963, Radio Singapura's stations became part of Radio Malaysia and rebranded as "Radio Malaysia (Singapura)".

Television broadcasting
Shortly after Singapore reached self-government status on 3 June 1959, there were plans to obtain television transmission rights. This manifested the founding of Television Singapura on 4 April 1961.

Television Singapura aired test broadcasts on channel 5 from 21 January to 15 February 1963, ahead of its first official pilot broadcast on the evening of 15 February 1963. Minister for Culture S. Rajaratnam became the first person to appear on Singapore TV, announcing that "Tonight might well mark the start of a social and cultural revolution in our lives." The first programme aired was a documentary, TV Looks at Singapore. The pilot service would broadcast for one hour and 40 minutes nightly; at the time, it was estimated that only one in 58 Singaporeans owned a television.

On 2 April 1963, Channel 5 was officially inaugurated by President Yusof Ishak; the service expanded to 7:15 to 11:00 p.m. nightly. By September, its broadcast day had been lengthened to begin at 6:30 p.m. Initially, Channel 5 carried programmes in all four of Singapore's official languages. On 23 November, Channel 8 launched to carry programming in Chinese and Tamil, with Channel 5 focusing on English and Malay programming thereafter.

In January 1964, Television Singapura became the state branch of the new Televisyen Malaysia from Kuala Lumpur and was subsequently rebranded as sister channel "Television Malaysia (Singapura)". During its time as part of Malaysia, Singapore, like its three other partners–Sabah, Sarawak and Malaya had its own radio network, but Singapore was the only state to have its own television network. The state's radio and television broadcast right was included as an annex in the Malaysia Agreement which garnered autonomy in this area, among others.

1965–1980: Radio Television Singapore
After the separation of Singapore from the Malaysian federation, all of the Malaysian television and radio operations in Singapore were fused to become Radio Television Singapore (RTS), a part of the Ministry of Culture. This led to the expansions of the network, including a move to the new $3.6 million Television Centre in Caldecott Hill on 27 August 1966.

On 7 July 1974, Channel 5 broadcast the first programme in colour on Singaporean television, the 1974 FIFA World Cup Final. The following month on 9 August, the ninth National Day Parade marked the first domestic colour broadcast in Singapore. Full-time colour broadcasts began on 1 November 1977.

1980–1994: Singapore Broadcasting Corporation

The government officially dissolved RTS on 31 January 1980 and transferred its assets to the then-new Singapore Broadcasting Corporation, a statutory board under national supervision to free RTS from the administrative and budgetary constraints that had hampered its ability to upgrade broadcasting services to meet the growing expectations of local audiences. On 31 January 1984, SBC launched Channel 12, a new television service devoted to cultural programming. It also launched four radio stations: "Perfect 10", "YES" (airing Mandarin music), "Ria" (airing popular Malay music) and "Class 95" (initially airing classic hits). SBC began stereo broadcasting on its television channels on 1 August 1990.

An educational programming block known as CDIS (Curriculum Development Institute of Singapore) began airing on Channel 12 on 4 January 1993 produced by the Ministry of Education for SBC in response to Malaysia's TV Pendidikan and the then Indonesian TPI blocktime service on TVRI. On 1 February of that year, SBC celebrated its 30 years of television broadcasting. On 7 June that year, Channel 8 expanded its airtime, now broadcasting from 3:00 p.m. on weekdays. On 1 December that year, SBC launched a satellite television network named Singapore International Television (SITV).

On 1 January 1994, Channel 5 moved its remaining Malay programming to Channel 12, and re-launched as an English-language channel.

Radio Singapore International (RSI) was launched on 1 February 1994 as the official radio international broadcasting company in Singapore, airing news and current affairs, lifestyle, and music programming in English, Malay, Mandarin and Indonesian.

1994–1999: Privatisation
On 1 October 1994, SBC was privatised into a new holding company, Singapore International Media (SIM), with three business units: Television Corporation of Singapore (TCS), Radio Corporation of Singapore (RCS), and Television Twelve (TV12).

On 1 September 1995, Channel 8 expanded into a 24-hour network focusing exclusively on Mandarin-language programmes, while its Tamil programming was assumed by Prime 12—a relaunch of Channel 12 which focused on multilingual programming. TV12 also launched a spin-off channel known as Premiere 12, which featured arts, culture, documentaries, children's, and sports programmes.

TCS launched its own film production studio Raintree Pictures on 1 August 1998.

1999–2015: Media Corporation of Singapore

On 1 March 1999, TCS launched Channel NewsAsia (CNA), a local news channel. On 15 June that year, the Singapore International Media group of companies restructured into MediaCorp.

On 30 January 2000, Prime 12 and Premiere 12 were renamed Suria and Central respectively; Suria would be a Malay-language channel, while Central would be divided into three dayparted blocks under the brands "Kids Central" (children's programming), "Vasantham Central" (Tamil-language programming), and "Arts Central". SportCity, a sports channel, was also launched the same year. In September 2000, CNA launched an international feed, intending to expand the service into a pan-Asian network. On 10 November, Today was launched as a free newspaper to compete with Singapore Press Holdings. The newspaper was owned by MediaCorp, together with SingTel and SMRT, with DelGro pulling out two days earlier.

On 12 February 2001, the Television Corporation of Singapore, Radio Corporation of Singapore and Singapore Television Twelve were renamed to Mediacorp TV, Mediacorp Radio, Mediacorp TV12 respectively as part of a new management plan following their dissolution.

MediaCorp's monopoly on free-to-air television was broken in May 2001, when the Singapore government granted new free-to-air licenses to SPH MediaWorks, a subsidiary of publisher Singapore Press Holdings. The company launched two channels in English and Chinese respectively, TVWorks (later Channel i) and Channel U. In late-2004, citing financial issues and a small market for English-language programmes, SPH sold the channels to Mediacorp; Channel i was shut down on 1 January 2005, while Channel U continued as a complement to Channel 8.

On 11 November 2007, Mediacorp launched HD5, the first high definition television channel in Singapore. In August 2008, MediaCorp also launched MOBTV, an online television service. On 19 October 2008, Central was dissolved, with Vasantham becoming a full-time service in its channel space, and its children's and arts programming spun out into the new channel Okto in Channel i's channel space.

Owing to the diminished effectiveness of a shortwave radio service over time with changing technology and media consumption habits, RSI was dissolved on 31 October 2008.

In 2007, in effort to establish a new generation of actresses, Mediacorp identified and grouped the seven most promising young Mediacorp actresses from Singapore in the 2000s, namely Jesseca Liu, Jeanette Aw, Rui En, Fiona Xie, Joanne Peh, Felicia Chin and Dawn Yeoh, then all in their twenties, and referred to them collectively as Seven Princesses of Mediacorp (新传媒七公主). A similar grouping of its male artistes for similar reasons was carried out in 2014, grouping eight promising upcoming Mediacorp actors from Singapore in the 2010s, namely Zhang Zhenhuan, Romeo Tan, Desmond Tan, Jeffrey Xu, Xu Bin, Ian Fang, Aloysius Pang and Shane Pow, and were collectively known as the "8 Dukes of Caldecott Hill".

2015–present: New headquarters, transition to digital

On 8 December 2015, Mediacorp officially opened a new headquarters at one-north's Mediapolis development. The 12-storey complex was designed by DP Architects and Maki and Associates and features a "fenceless" design with four studios, a 1,500-seat "broadcast-ready" theatre, and an integrated multi-platform newsroom. The company expected to complete the migration from its previous Caldecott Hill facilities by July 2016. Alongside the new headquarters, Mediacorp also unveiled a new logo, which was designed to reflect the broadcaster's "vibrancy" and "multiplicity", acting as an "a window to the world and a reflection of life".

In April 2017, the weekend editions of its newspaper Today went digital and in September 2017, Today came fully digital and ceased print publication. In September 2018, magazines 8 Days and i-Weekly ceased print publications and went solely on their digital platforms, with i-Weekly later merged with Channel 8 News as 8world for Chinese news, entertainment and lifestyle contents.

At midnight on 2 January 2019, Mediacorp's analogue television signals signed off, completing Singapore's transition to digital terrestrial television.

On 1 May 2019, Okto was discontinued as a standalone channel, with its children's programming becoming a daytime block on Channel 5 under the Okto on 5 branding. Okto's sports programming was moved primarily to other Mediacorp outlets. Okto branding was also appeared on Channel 8 as Okto on 8.

On 30 January 2020, Mediacorp rebranded its digital media platforms Toggle, MeRadio and MeClub as meWatch, meListen and meRewards respectively. The rebranding came as part of the broadcaster's "Made for You" initiative to build multi-platform services "designed around consumers' preferences and consumption habits".

On 16 January 2023, Mediacorp announced a rebranding of nearly all of its properties, which officially took effect on 1 February. The properties adopted a unified branding scheme based around flat design, with logos prefixed by an encircled Mediacorp logo, which the Mediacorp logo also appeared on CNA.

Terrestrial stations

Television
Mediacorp operates six, commercially-supported terrestrial channels in Singapore, which broadcast in the four official languages of the country (Malay, Singapore English, Mandarin Chinese  and Tamil). The company holds a monopoly on terrestrial television within the country.

Radio
Mediacorp operates eleven FM radio channels. The company's digital audio broadcasting service was discontinued on 1 December 2011.

Digital platforms

meWATCH

meWATCH (formerly Toggle) was launched on 1 February 2013 as an OTT service. On 1 April 2015, xinmsn was merged with Toggle. It is Mediacorp's digital video service that redefines TV viewing, bringing Toggle Originals, catch-up content, live coverage of key national events, news, entertainment, and behind-the-scene exclusives to viewers across multiple devices – computers, tablets, smartphones, smart television sets, and digital media players.

meLISTEN

meLISTEN (formerly MeRadio) is an audio digital platform focusing on live audio streaming of Mediacorp's eleven radio stations as well as audio podcasts. This platform is also where they offered their online radio stations, such as IndieGo for independent music and urban adult contemporary.

Mediacorp Partner Network
In 2018, Mediacorp launched the Mediacorp Partner Network. Under the MPN, Mediacorp signed agreements with brands like:
 ESPN on 6 August 2018, where Mediacorp will be the exclusive representative for all ad sales in Singapore for ESPN.com, while ESPN will launch a dedicated Singapore edition of the ESPN site to deliver a mix of local sports news and features in addition to coverage of global sports.
 99.co on 29 August 2018 to create property related news and information for consumers.
 Edipresse in November 2018 to co-develop content across digital editorial platforms, TV, live radio and events. Such content will be made available on both Mediacorp and Edipresse Media platforms, utilising the regional reach and influence of both companies.
 VICE on 23 April 2019 to bring original VICE digital and TV content to a new Singapore audience via Mediacorp's multi-platform reach.

Flagship programmes
Some of Mediacorp's flagship programmes include:
 Star Awards – Mediacorp's Chinese awards event
 118 – long-form Channel 8 drama. 255-episode 118 I aired from 2014 – 2015, 218-episode 118 II ran from 2016 – 2017, and a special 23-episode 118 Reunion aired in 2018.
 Tanglin – long-form Channel 5 daily drama that centred on the lives of multiracial and multigenerational families in a middle-income neighbourhood, in the Holland Village, Tanglin. The 823-episode show ran from 2015 to 2018.
 KIN – ongoing long-form Channel 5 weekends drama launched in 2018 (after Tanglin's conclusion).
 Getai Challenge – singing talent search competition that aimed to promote the Getai culture and discover aspiring Getai singers. Season 1 was shown on Channel 8 in 2015, and Season 2 in 2018.
 SPOP SING! –  an initiative launched by Mediacorp in 2018 to showcase and curate local music compositions.
 Abang Teksi – Suria only Malay sitcom aired season 1 from 2017 and season 2 from 2019.
 Forensik – Suria drama and spin-off to Code Of Law Singapore launched in 2020.

Production
In 2000, MediaCorp Studios was created to produce content for MediaCorp TV channels, such as Channel 5, Channel U and Channel 8. In 2001, EagleVision was created to produce content for Suria and Vasantham. They co-produce programmes with regional broadcasters and production houses such as Media Prima Malaysia, Radio Televisyen Malaysia, Radio Television Brunei, Eightgeman Taiwan and Taiwan Television.

See also

 Mass media of Singapore
 Censorship in Singapore
 List of programmes broadcast by Channel 5 (Singapore)
 List of programmes broadcast by Mediacorp Channel 8
 List of programmes broadcast by Channel U (Singapore)
 List of programs broadcast by Mediacorp Vasantham
 List of programmes broadcast by CNA

References

External links

 Official website

 
1937 establishments in the Straits Settlements
Temasek Holdings
 
Magazine publishing companies
Newspaper companies of Singapore
Mass media companies established in 1937
Mass media companies of Singapore
Government-owned companies of Singapore
Multilingual broadcasters
Singaporean brands